Woodside may refer to:

Places and buildings

Australia 
Woodside, South Australia, a town
Woodside, Victoria, a town

Canada 
Woodside National Historic Site, the boyhood home of William Lyon Mackenzie King
Woodside, Nova Scotia, a neighborhood in Dartmouth, Nova Scotia
Woodside, Kings County, Nova Scotia

India
Woodside, in Ooty, Tamil Nadu, a home of botanist Thomas C. Jerdon

Ireland
 Woodside, Rathfarnham, a housing estate in Rathfarnham, Dublin

New Zealand 
 Woodside, Wellington, a locality near Greytown in the Wairarapa
 Woodside, Otago, a locality near Moeraki in North Otago
 Woodside Glen, a locality near Outram, Otago

United Kingdom 
Woodside, Aberdeen, a district of Aberdeen
Woodside, Dundee, a small housing scheme in Dundee
Woodside, Bedfordshire, a hamlet near Luton
Woodside, Berkshire (hamlet), a hamlet on the edge of Windsor Great Park
Woodside, Old Windsor, an historic house near Old Windsor, Berkshire 
Woodside, Bradford, a locality south of Buttershaw in Bradford, West Yorkshire
Woodside, Cheshire, a settlement in Cheshire
Woodside, County Durham, a village in County Durham
Woodside, Cumbria, a civil parish
Woodside, Glasgow, a district of Glasgow
Woodside, London, a neighbourhood in the London Borough of Croydon, South London
Woodside (ward), an electoral ward of the Croydon London Borough Council
Woodside, Merseyside, a locality in Birkenhead, Wirral
Woodside, Paisley, a district of Paisley
Woodside Estate, an industrial estate in Dunstable, Bedfordshire
Woodside, Telford, a suburb
Woodside, Dudley, an area of Dudley, West Midlands
Woodside, a district of Horsforth, West Yorkshire
Woodside, Perth and Kinross, a village in Perthshire
Woodside, County Tyrone, a townland in County Tyrone, Northern Ireland, see list of townlands of County Tyrone
Woodside Park, a suburb of north London
Woodside Stadium, a multi-purpose stadium in Watford, Hertfordshire

United States 
 Woodside (Belle Mina, Alabama), a historic residence
 Woodside, California, a small incorporated town in San Mateo County, California
 Woodside Store, Woodside, California
 Woodside, Delaware, a town in Kent County, Delaware
 Woodside (Mt. Pleasant, Delaware), a historic home
 Woodside Methodist Episcopal Church, Woodside, Delaware
 Woodside (Marion, Indiana), a home designed by architect Frank Lloyd Wright
 Woodside/John T. Bate House, Louisville, Kentucky; listed on the National Register of Historic Places in Jefferson County, Kentucky
 Woodside (Clinton, Louisiana), listed on the National Register of Historic Places in East Feliciana Parish, Louisiana
 Woodside (Abingdon, Maryland), a historic home
 Woodside (Silver Spring, Maryland), a neighborhood 
 Woodside Township, Otter Tail County, Minnesota
 Woodside Township, Polk County, Minnesota
 Woodside, Missouri, an unincorporated community
 Woodside Presbyterian Church, a historic church in Troy, New York
 Woodside, Queens, a neighborhood in the borough of Queens, New York City
61st Street–Woodside (IRT Flushing Line)
Woodside station (LIRR)
 Woodside (Lincolnton, North Carolina), a historic plantation home
 Woodside (Milton, North Carolina), a historic plantation home
 Woodside, Ohio, an unincorporated community
 Woodside, Pennsylvania, a census-designated place in Bucks County, Pennsylvania
 Woodside, Utah, a ghost town
 Woodside (Buckingham, Virginia), a historic plantation home
 Woodside (Delaplane, Virginia), a historic home
 Woodside (Tuckahoe, Virginia), a villa in Henrico County, Virginia

Other uses
 Woodside (surname)
 Woodside Energy, an Australian company

See also
 Woodside Park (disambiguation)
 Woodside School (disambiguation)
 Woodside station (disambiguation)